William Henry Whitmore (born in Dorchester, Massachusetts, September 6, 1836; died in Boston, June 14, 1900) was a Boston businessman, politician and genealogist.

Biography
He was the son of a Boston merchant, and was educated in Boston's public schools. He devoted the leisure from his business life to antiquarian research and authorship. For eight years, he was a member of the Boston Common Council, of which he became president in 1879, and he was a trustee of the Boston Public Library from 1885 to 1888. The degree of AM was conferred on him by Harvard and Williams in 1867.

About 1868 he was one of the patentees of a machine for making sugar cubes, and in 1882 he patented one for making hyposulphite of soda. His “Ancestral Tablets” (Boston, 1868) was an invention for genealogists, being a set of pages cut and arranged to admit the insertion of a pedigree in a condensed form.

He was a founder of the Historical Magazine in 1857, of the Prince Society in 1858, and of the Boston Antiquarian Society in 1879, to which the Bostonian Society succeeded. Whitmore was an editor of the New England Historical and Genealogical Register, in which many of his papers first appeared, and The Heraldic Journal, which he established in 1863.

Publications
He has edited:
 The Poetical Works of Winthrop Mackworth Praed (New York, 1860)
 The Hutchinson Papers, with William Appleton (2 vols., Boston, 1865), for the Prince Society
 Dunton's Letters (1867), for the Prince Society
 Andros Tracts (3 vols., 1868-'74), for the Prince Society
 A Record of the Descendants of Captain John Ayres of Brookfield, Mass (1870, Boston, T.R. Marvin & Son, 88 Pages)
 Records of the Boston Record Commission, which he established in 1875 (20+ vols.)
 Sewall's Diary, co-editor, writing all the local notes (Boston, 1875-'82)
He prepared the a codification of laws for adoption, his codification being passed by the legislature almost unchanged in 1876.
Other political works:
 Revision of the City Ordinances, with Henry W. Putnam (1882)
 Report on the State Seal, accepted by the legislature in 1885
He reprinted in facsimile the “Laws of Massachusetts of 1672” (Boston, 1887).
Whitmore contributed to various magazines, native and foreign, and was the author of many genealogies, the most important of which are the families of Temple, Lane, Norton, Winthrop, Hutchinson, Usher, Ayres, Payne, Whitmore, Lee, Dalton, and Wilcox. 
Other works:
 Handbook of American Genealogy (Albany, 1862), reprinted with additions as The American Genealogist (1868)
 The Cavalier Dismounted, an essay (Salem, 1864)
 Elements of Heraldry (Boston, 1866)
 Massachusetts Civil List, 1636-1774 (Albany, 1870)
 Copp's Hill Epitaphs (Albany, 1878)
 History of the Old State-House, issued by the city of Boston (1882)
 Life of Abel Brown, the engraver (Boston, 1884)

Notes

References

External links
 
 

1836 births
1900 deaths
Politicians from Boston
American genealogists
Boston City Council members
19th-century American historians
19th-century American male writers
19th-century American politicians
Historians from Massachusetts
Trustees of the Boston Public Library
American male non-fiction writers